Haji Hussain Ansari (born  – 3 October 2020) was an Indian politician and a leader of the Jharkhand Mukti Morcha (JMM). He served as Minister of Minority Welfare and Registration Department in the Government of Jharkhand since 28 January 2020. Ansari was the first and only Muslim to become minister in the state of Jharkhand. He was elected to the Jharkhand Assembly on the JMM ticket four times from Madhupur Assembly constituency in 1995, 2000, 2009 and 2019 respectively. He also acted as the leader of the opposition in 2004.

Life
Ansari was born in the village of Pipra near Madhupur.

Ansari started his political career with the Indian National Congress in the 1980s. In the early 1990s he joined Jharkhand Mukti Morcha which was under the leadership of Shibu Soren. He contested the election for the Madhupur Assembly constituency in 1995 and won the election. Together with Soren Ansari he played an important role in the movement for statehood of Jharkhand. He was again elected MLA in 2000 for the Madhupur constituency. He was elected as leader of the opposition in 2004. He was elected once more in the 2009 Jharkhand Legislative Assembly election. During 2010 Ansari served as chairman of the Hajj committee of Jharkhand.

On 10 October 2010 he was named Minister for Minority Welfare in the Third Arjun Munda ministry. He thereby became the first Muslim minister in the government of Jharkhand. In August 2013 he was named Minister in the First Hemant Soren ministry. He was elected once more in the 2019 Jharkhand Legislative Assembly election. On 28 January 2020, he was appointed Minister of Minority Welfare and Registration in the Second Hemant Soren ministry.

Personal life
Ansari underwent open-heart surgery in 2018.  He tested positive for COVID-19 during the COVID-19 pandemic in India in September 2020, and entered the Medanta hospital in Ranchi. He died there on 3 October 2020, aged 70 or 73, due to cardiac arrest, the day after testing negative for COVID-19. After his death the Chief Minister of Jharkhand, Hemant Soren, announced a two-day state mourning period.

References

20th-century births
Year of birth missing
2020 deaths
Activists from Jharkhand
People from Deoghar district
Deaths from the COVID-19 pandemic in India
21st-century Indian Muslims
Bihar MLAs 1995–2000
Jharkhand MLAs 2000–2005
Jharkhand MLAs 2009–2014
Jharkhand MLAs 2019–2024
Jharkhand Mukti Morcha politicians
State cabinet ministers of Jharkhand